The 1932–33 United States collegiate men's ice hockey season was the 39th season of collegiate ice hockey in the United States.

Regular season

Standings

References

1932–33 NCAA Standings

External links
College Hockey Historical Archives

1932–33 United States collegiate men's ice hockey season
College